Robert Hurst (1750 – 13 April 1843) was an English Whig politician.  He was Member of Parliament (MP) for boroughs from 1806 to 1829.

Political career
At the 1802 general election, Hurst was elected to the House of Commons for two constituencies: Shaftesbury and Steyning. The result of the election in Shaftesbury was disputed, but once the dispute had been settled in his favour he chose to represent Shaftesbury, and did not sit for Steyning in the remainder of the Parliament.

At the 1806 general election he was returned again for Steyning, and held that seat until the 1812 general election, when he was elected as MP for Horsham, a seat which he held until 1829, when he resigned his seat by taking the Chiltern Hundreds.

Family
Hurst married in 1784 Maria Smith, daughter of Adam Smith: they had two sons and five daughters. The eldest son, Robert Henry Hurst, represented Horsham as a Radical.

References

External links 

1750 births
1843 deaths
Whig (British political party) MPs for English constituencies
Members of the Parliament of the United Kingdom for English constituencies
UK MPs 1802–1806
UK MPs 1806–1807
UK MPs 1807–1812
UK MPs 1812–1818
UK MPs 1818–1820
UK MPs 1820–1826
UK MPs 1826–1830